is a 26-episode anime television series. The main character is a 15-year-old English girl named Jane Buxton, who dreams of building a flying machine due to the influence of her brother. The series documents her journey through the Near East to find her brother, who went missing after headed to the Near East to look for a floating liquid in an expedition. It is set in the late 19th century where impossible technologies such as landships and "floating liquid" exist side by side in a steampunk world.

The series is loosely based on two works by Jules Verne—his posthumous 1919 novel The Barsac Mission (L’Étonnante Aventure de la mission Barsac, consisting of two volumes—Book 1, Into the Niger Bend, and Book 2, City in the Sahara) as well as his 1896 novel Facing the Flag (Face au drapeau).

It was included in Jury selections in the 2002 Japan Media Arts Festival for the animation division.

References

External links

2002 anime television series debuts
Adventure anime and manga
Anime based on novels
Anime with original screenplays
Television shows based on works by Jules Verne
Science fiction anime and manga
Steampunk anime and manga
TMS Entertainment
Wowow original programming